Henrique Mendonça de Mattos (born July 25, 1990 in Ribeirão Preto), known as Henrique Mattos, is a Brazilian footballer who plays for Imperatriz as defender.

Career statistics

References

External links

1990 births
Living people
Brazilian footballers
Association football defenders
Campeonato Brasileiro Série A players
Campeonato Brasileiro Série B players
Campeonato Brasileiro Série D players
Botafogo Futebol Clube (SP) players
Sport Club do Recife players
Joinville Esporte Clube players
Grêmio Osasco Audax Esporte Clube players
Campinense Clube players
Sociedade Imperatriz de Desportos players
People from Ribeirão Preto
Footballers from São Paulo (state)